Suda may refer to:

Suda (surname)
Suda, Nepal, a village development committee in Kanchanpur District in the Mahakali Zone of south-western Nepal
Suda (river), a river in Vologda Oblast in Russia
Suda Station, a train station in Hashimoto, Wakayama Prefecture, Japan 
Naka-Suda Station, a former railway station in Kaminokuni, Hokkaido, Japan 
Suda Bay Passage, a channel through reef off the western coast of Australia
Suda Bay (ship), a 14.3 ton Australian motor boat 
As Suda', a village in south-western Yemen 
Suda Hachiman Shrine Mirror, a National Treasure of Japan
Hasaki Ya Suda, a 2011 Burkina Faso film
Scopula suda, a moth of the family Geometridae
Suda (marque), a Chinese car maker

See also
Souda (disambiguation)